Kachanovo is the name of several rural localities in Russia:
Kachanovo, Ostrovsky District, Pskov Oblast, a village in Ostrovsky District, Pskov Oblast
Kachanovo, Palkinsky District, Pskov Oblast, a selo in Palkinsky District, Pskov Oblast
Kachanovo, Ryazan Oblast, a village in Pionersky Rural Okrug of Rybnovsky District of Ryazan Oblast
Kachanovo, Tver Oblast, a village in Kuvshinovsky District of Tver Oblast